Elections Canada is the non-partisan agency responsible for administering Canadian federal elections and referendums. Elections Canada is an office of the Parliament of Canada, and reports directly to Parliament rather than to the Government of Canada.

Responsibilities
Elections Canada is responsible for:
 Making sure that all voters have access to the electoral system
 Informing citizens about the electoral system
 Maintaining the National Register of Electors
 Enforcing electoral legislation
 Training election officers
 Producing maps of electoral districts
 Registering political parties, electoral district associations, and third parties that engage in election advertising
 Administering the allowances paid to registered political parties
 Monitoring election spending by candidates, political parties and third parties
 Publishing financial information on political parties, electoral district associations, candidates, nomination contestants, leadership contestants and third parties
 Supporting the independent commissions responsible for adjusting the boundaries of federal electoral districts every ten years
 Reporting to Parliament on the administration of elections and referendums

Appointments and staff
The House of Commons of Canada appoints the chief electoral officer to head the agency. The chief electoral officer also appoints the commissioner of Canada elections, who ensures that the Canada Elections Act is enforced. The broadcasting arbitrator, who allocates paid and free broadcasting time during electoral events, is appointed by a unanimous decision of registered political parties in the House of Commons, or by the chief electoral officer if the parties fail to agree a candidate. The chief electoral officer is seconded by the deputy chief electoral officer, chief legal counsel and around 500 to 600 staff, mainly situated in the National Capital Region. During a general election or referendum, this rises to 235,000 workers

Compliance, enforcement and regulation

The commissioner of canada elections is responsible for regulating federal electoral events and enforcing compliance with the Canada Elections Act.

Before 2018, the commissioner was appointed in consultation with the director of public prosecutions and was overseen by the director, but has since become part of the Office of the Chief Electoral Officer.

See also

Elections in Canada
Commissioner of Canada Elections
Federal political financing in Canada
List of federal political parties in Canada
In and Out scandal
Robocall scandal

References

Notes

External links

Elections Canada's election financing databases

Canada
Federal departments and agencies of Canada
Government agencies established in 1920
1920 establishments in Canada
Organizations based in Gatineau